Dyer & Blair Investment Bank is a Kenyan investment firm that engages in regional investment banking, securities, investment management, and other financial services with both Individual and institutional clients. It is regulated by the Capital Markets Authority.

History

Dyer & Blair Investment Bank was founded in  Nairobi in 1954 as a partnership of Stockbrokers Hickman & Grey. In that year, it became one of the six founding members of the Nairobi Stock Exchange (NSE), established in the same year.

In 1956, Messrs Derek Ingram Dyer & Patrick Murdoch Blair took over ownership from Hickman & Grey and changed the firm's name to Dyer & Blair to represent the new ownership.

The Kenya Commercial Bank (KCB) acquired full ownership of Dyer & Blair partnership in 1973 and incorporated the partnership it into a limited liability company operating as a wholly owned subsidiary of the bank. This was in the aim of offering brokerage services to their clients.

In 1983, KCB sold its entire shareholding in Dyer & Blair  to local investors including business man Jimnah Mbaru.

Dyer & Blair converted into a fully-fledged licensed investment bank in 2004.

Markets

Dyer & Blair Operates in East Africa Through its whole owned subsidiaries in Kenya, Uganda and Rwanda. The Investment bank is a member of the NSE, USE and the RSE.

Achievements

Dyer & Blair won the tender to be the transaction adviser for the USD 840 Million Safaricom IPO.
 The firm was selected as the Sole adviser for the acquisition of a 24.99% stake by Investment Partners, a private equity firm, in Equity Bank Group of Kenya for USD 179 Million. This was one of the largest mergers & acquisition transaction in the Eastern Africa region.
Was the lead adviser for the Bralirwa IPO. This was the first IPO on the Rwanda Stock Exchange.
Was the lead adviser for the NIC Insurance Uganda IPO. This was the first Insurance Company to list on the Uganda Stock Exchange.

See also

 Nairobi Securities Exchange
 Uganda Securities Exchange
 Rwanda Stock Exchange
 List of investment banks in Kenya
 DFCU Group

References

Companies based in Nairobi
Kenyan companies established in 1954
Banks of Kenya
Banks established in 1954